Faculty of Accounting and Financial Sciences of Petroleum University of Technology, National Iranian Oil Company is the oldest and the most famous center of higher education in accounting in Iran. The Faculty was established in 1958, seven years after the nationalization of the oil industry, by the scholars such Prof. Hassan Sajjadi Nejad and Dr. Esmail Erfani with the support of Abdullah Entezam, then CEO of National Iranian Oil Company. The school started with 61 students from the Higher Institute of Accounting and Compliance with National Iranian Oil Company personnel launches.

History 

 Founded in 1958, seven years after the nationalization of the oil industry, by the scholars such Prof. Hassan Sadjadi Nejad, the father of accounting in Iran and Dr. Esmail Erfani with the support of Abdullah Entezam, then CEO of National Iranian Oil Company, by the name of "the Higher School of Accounting".
 In 1962, the students of the first class of Accounting were graduated.
In 1972 the Higher School of Accounting renamed to  "School of Accounting and Financial Sciences of National Iranian Oil Company".
After the Iranian Revolution of 1979, merged with the Allameh Tabatabai University, but in 1988 started its career under the name of "School of Accounting and Financial Sciences of the National Iranian Oil Company".
In 1989 the School of Accounting and Finance merged with the Petroleum University of Technology and now is known as the Tehran Faculty of Accounting, Economics, and Management (N.I.O.C. school of Accounting and Finance).

َAcademics

َDepartments 
The Faculty has four Departments:

Department of Accounting and Finance
Department of Energy Economics and Management
Department of Law
Department of Industrial Engineering

Programs 
There are some programs given in PUT School of Accounting and Financial Sciences

BSc. of Accounting 
BSc. of Management in Business 
BSc. of Industrial Management
MSc. of Finance (Track; Corporate Finance)
MSc. of Managerial Accounting
MSc. of Law
MSc. of Energy Economics 
MSc. of Reservoir Management
MSc. of Industrial Engineering (Track; Production Management)

Former Presidents

Academic background
Since its establishment, Petroleum School of Accounting always had admitted the top students of National Wide University Entrance Examinations (Konkur). Additionally, according to the results of MS Entrance Examinations PUT students are the best among other universities like Sharif University of Technology and Amirkabir University of Technology and N.I.O.C. school of Accounting and Finance has major contribution in obtaining this honor.

Notable alumni
Valiollah Seif, Governor of Central Bank of the Islamic Republic of Iran
Dr. Ali M. Sedaghat, Professor of Sellinger School of Business in loyola University Maryland
Dr. Hossein B. Kazemi, Michael & Cheryl Philipp Professor of Finance, University of Massachusetts Amherst
Prof. Mohammad S.Bazaz, Professor of Accounying California State University
Prof. Massood Saffarian, Professor of Accounting Rogers State University
Dr. Mahnaz Mahdavi, Ann F. Kaplan Director & Professor of Economics, Smith College
, one of Iranian eminent Accounting leaders
, the first secretary of Iran Exchange Market
Abolghasem Fakharian, chairman of Iranian Institute of Certified Accountants

References

1958 establishments in Iran
Business schools in Tehran
Educational institutions established in 1958